This is a list of United States Air Force air refueling squadrons.

Air refueling squadrons

See also
List of United States Air Force squadrons

Air Refueling